Labeobarbus brauni is a species of ray-finned fish in the  family Cyprinidae. It is endemic to the Luhoho River system in the Democratic Republic of the Congo.

References

brauni
Taxa named by Jacques Pellegrin
Fish described in 1935
Endemic fauna of the Democratic Republic of the Congo